The Noida Sector 51 is a starting station of the Noida Metro in the city of Noida, Uttar Pradesh. It was opened to the public on 25 January 2019.

The station is connected to the Noida Sector 52 metro station on the Delhi Metro's Blue Line by a 300-metre-long pedestrian walkway. An overhead walkway connecting the two stations will be built by IKEA as part of an agreement signed between the company and the Noida Authority in February 2021. However, IKEA later stated that it would require at least 6 years to open its new showroom in Noida and the adjoining skywalk. In March 2022, the Noida Authority stated that it had floated tenders to construct a 420 metre long and five metre wide, L-shaped, foot overbridge connecting the two stations.

References

External links

Noida Metro stations
Railway stations in Gautam Buddh Nagar district
Transport in Noida